Kawkhali is an Upazila of Rangamati District in the Division of Chittagong, Bangladesh.

Demographics 
This Kawkhali has a population of 42,409.  Males constitute 53.91% of the population, and females 46.09%. Kawkhali has an average literacy rate of 27.7%, against the national average of 32.4% literate.

Administration 
Kawkhali Upazila is divided into four union parishads: Betbunia, Fatikchhari, Ghagra, and Kalampati. The union parishads are subdivided into 11 mauzas and 149 villages.

See also 
 Upazilas of Bangladesh
 Districts of Bangladesh
 Divisions of Bangladesh

References 

Upazilas of Rangamati Hill District